Henry Ah Kew (22 September 1900 – 19 January 1966) was a New Zealand lawyer and community leader. He was born in Auckland, New Zealand, on 22 September 1900.

In 1953, Ah Kew was awarded the Queen Elizabeth II Coronation Medal.

References

1900 births
1966 deaths
New Zealand people of Chinese descent
20th-century New Zealand lawyers